Silvia Albano (born September 12, 1994) is a professional Italian tennis player. On October 25, 2010, she reached her highest WTA singles ranking of 954 whilst her best doubles ranking was 941 on August 30, 2010.

References

External links

1994 births
Living people
Italian female tennis players
21st-century Italian women